La Sâle is a mountain of the Swiss Pennine Alps, overlooking the Lac des Dix in the canton of Valais. It is located between the valleys of Bagnes and Hérens, north of Le Pleureur.

References

External links
 La Sâle on Hikr

Mountains of the Alps
Alpine three-thousanders
Mountains of Switzerland
Mountains of Valais